Río Inabón is one of one of the 14 rivers in the municipality of Ponce, Puerto Rico. It is fed by the Río Anón, Río Guayo (which itself is fed by the Chiquita Brook and the Indalecia Brook) and the Emajagua Brook. It is also fed by Río Bacas and Río de las Raices. With a watershed area covering 38.18 square miles, Río Inabón also has the second largest basin area of any of the municipality's 14 rivers after Río Jacaguas.

Origin and course
The river runs mostly parallel to PR-511.

Uses
"A provision in The Treaty of Paris of 1898 grants the Serrallés family exclusive rights to the Río Inabón. This river winds through Puerto Rico’s volcanic mountains, and is the exclusive water source for DonQ Rum". Today Río Inabón is one of the most popular rivers for swimming in southern Puerto Rico. Some 10 private reservoirs in the Ponce area are fed by the waters of Río Inabón.

Environmental contamination
In January 2011, Puerto Rico Representative Víctor Vassallo Anadón presented a bill into the Puerto Rico House of Representatives that would improve the sewer system of residents near the river to avoid contaminating it with sewer waters.

Endangered species
The fern Thelypteris inabonensis found at the headwaters of Río Inabón and at the Toro Negro State Forest has been identified by the U.S. Fish and Wildlife Service as an endangered species.

Flow
The flow of water in the river is controlled by the floodgates at Toa Vaca Lake, located in the municipality of Villalba.  Río Inabon has a discharge of 15,000 ft3/s.  The Inabón has been known to overflow easily in times of heavy rains. Several rescues have taken place when the river has increased its level rapidly, a phenomenon known as flash flood. Due to its proximity to the eastern end of Aeropuerto Mercedita, the river has affected the operation of the airport in times of heavy rains. This was the case with the hurricane Maria in September 2017.

Course of the river
The following table summarizes the course of Río Inabón in terms of roads crossed. Roads are listed as the river flows from its origin in the mountains of Barrio Anón, north of the city of Ponce, to the Caribbean Sea in the south (N/A = Data not available): 

*Marker requires field verification.

See also
 List of rivers of Puerto Rico
 List of rivers of Ponce

Notes
1.Google Maps incorrectly labels some of the northern portions of Río Inabón as Río Anón. This is most evident in portions just below where Rio Anón feeds into Rio Inabón. See HereWeGo Maps  and MapQuest  for labeling consistent with Government of Puerto Rico and USGS labeling.

References

External links
 USGS Geographic Names Information Service
 YouTube video of Rio Inabon at Km 6.7 of PR-511 on 16 October 2010.

Rivers of Puerto Rico
Rivers of Ponce, Puerto Rico
Barrio Real